Tipamahto Aski 95A is an Indian reserve of the One Arrow First Nation in Saskatchewan. It is 15 kilometres northwest of Duck Lake.

References

Indian reserves in Saskatchewan